Kumanovo library is a public library in Kumanovo, North Macedonia.

References

Buildings and structures in Kumanovo
Libraries in North Macedonia